King Cross Jankomir is a shopping centre located in Zagreb, Croatia, on Velimir Škorpik Street 34 in the neighbourhood of Jankomir. It was financed by Coimpredil and Coop Consumatori Nordest and opened on 21 September 2002. At the time of its opening, it was the largest shopping centre in Croatia. The shopping centre cost €67 million to build, and its investors partly funded the upgrade of the adjoining road infrastructure.

The shopping centre suffered a 20% loss in revenue and was rumoured to be the first centre in the city to close (and possibly be converted into a warehouse) due to the late 2000s recession. Nevertheless, it remained in business.

References

External links 
 

Shopping malls in Croatia
Buildings and structures in Zagreb
Shopping malls established in 2002
2002 establishments in Croatia
Economy of Zagreb